Belmunda is a coastal locality in the Mackay Region, Queensland, Australia.

Geography
The waters of the Coral Sea form the eastern boundary and part of the southern.

References 

Mackay Region
Coastline of Queensland
Localities in Queensland